Eupithecia nigrithorax is a moth in the  family Geometridae. It is found in Peru.

References

Moths described in 1904
nigrithorax
Moths of South America